George Washington Van Tassel (March 12, 1910 – February 9, 1978) was an American contactee, ufologist and author.

Early life
Van Tassel was born in Jefferson, Ohio in 1910, and grew up in a fairly prosperous middle-class family. He finished high school in the 10th grade and held a job at a small municipal airport near Cleveland; he also acquired a private pilot license. At age 20, he moved to California, where at first he worked as an automobile mechanic at a garage owned by an uncle.

While pumping gas at the garage, he met Frank Critzer, an eccentric loner who claimed to be working a mine somewhere near Giant Rock, a 7-story boulder near Landers, California in the Mojave Desert. Frank Critzer was claimed by others to be a German immigrant During World War II, however, he was born in the US. Critzer was under suspicion as a German spy and killed himself by a dynamite explosion during a police siege at the Rock in 1942. Upon receiving news of Critzer's death, Van Tassel applied for a lease of the small  abandoned airport near Giant Rock from the Bureau of Land Management, and was eventually given a Federal Government contract to develop and maintain  the airstrip.

Van Tassel became an aircraft mechanic and flight inspector who at various times between 1930 and 1947 worked for Douglas Aircraft, Hughes Aircraft, and Lockheed. While at Hughes Aircraft he was their Top Flight Inspector. In 1947, Van Tassel left Southern California's booming aerospace industry to live in the desert with his family. At first, he lived a simple existence in the rooms Frank Critzer had dug out under Giant Rock. Van Tassel eventually built a new home, a café, a gas station, a store, a small airstrip, and a guest ranch beside the Rock.

Integratron

George Van Tassel started hosting group meditation in 1953 in a room underneath Giant Rock, excavated by Frank Critzer. That year, according to Van Tassel the occupant of a space ship from the planet Venus woke him up, invited him on board his space ship, and both verbally and telepathically gave him a technique for rejuvenating the human body. In 1954, Van Tassel and others began building what they called the "Integratron" to perform the rejuvenation. According to Van Tassel, the Integratron was to be a structure for scientific research into time, anti-gravity and at extending human life, built partially upon the research of Nikola Tesla and Georges Lakhovsky. Van Tassel described the Integratron as being created for scientific and spiritual research with the aim to recharge and rejuvenate people's cells, "a time machine for basic research on rejuvenation, anti-gravity and time travel". The domed wood structure has a rotating metal apparatus on the outside he called an "electrostatic dirod". Van Tassel claimed it was made of non-ferromagnetic materials: wood, concrete, glass, and fibreglass, lacking even metal screws or nails. The Integratron was never fully completed due to Van Tassel's sudden death a few weeks before the official opening. In recent times some people who visit the unfinished Integratron claim to be rejuvenated by staying there, and experiencing "sound baths" inside.

Conventions and organizations
Van Tassel was a classic 1950s contactee in the mold of George Adamski, Truman Bethurum, Daniel Fry, Orfeo Angelucci and many others. He hosted "The Giant Rock Spacecraft Convention" annually beside the Rock, from 1953 to 1978, which attracted at its peak in 1959 as many as 10,000 attendees. Guests trekked to the desert by car or landed airplanes on Van Tassel's small airstrip, called Giant Rock Airport.

Over the years, every famous contactee of the period appeared personally at these conventions, and many more not-so-famous ones. References often state that the first and most famous contactee, George Adamski, pointedly boycotted these conventions; however, Adamski did, in fact attend the third convention, held in 1955, where he gave a 35-minute lecture and was interviewed by Edward J. Ruppelt, once head of the Air Force Project Blue Book. It was apparently the only such convention Adamski ever attended.

Van Tassel founded a metaphysics research organization called The Ministry of Universal Wisdom, and The College of Universal Wisdom to codify the spiritual revelations he was now regularly receiving via communications with the people from Space.

Death
George Van Tassel died in Santa Ana while printing a publication and visiting friends.

Publications
Van Tassel's book, I Rode A Flying Saucer (1952, 1955), recounts his claims of receiving "cosmic wisdom" from "Solgonda" and a large number of other people from space. Among his other works are Into This World and Out Again (1956), The Council of Seven Lights (1958), Religion and Science Merged, and When Stars Look Down.

See also
 Ashtar (extraterrestrial being)

References

Sources
 Lewis, James R., editor, UFOs and Popular Culture, Santa Barbara, CA: ABC-CLIO, Inc., 2000. .
 Ronald D. Story, editor, The Encyclopedia of Extraterrestrial Encounters, NY, NY: New American Library, 2001. .

External links
 "A Brief History of Giant Rock Covering the Last 90 Years (1887–1977)" , integratron.com; accessed 2 July 2017.
 Reminiscence of George Van Tassel, ufoevidence.org; accessed 2 July 2017. 
 
 

1910 births
1978 deaths
20th-century American writers
20th-century apocalypticists
American UFO writers
Writers from California
Channellers
Contactees
History of the Mojave Desert region
People from Jefferson, Ohio
People from San Bernardino County, California
Ufologists
UFO religions